Trecision S.p.A. was an Italian video game developer founded in 1991 by Pietro Montelatici, Fabrizio Lagorio and Edoardo Gervino. The company's headquarters was in Rapallo (province of Genoa).

Their first game was Profezia developed for Amiga and PC, followed by a number of titles for different platforms (Amiga, MS-DOS, PC, PlayStation, PlayStation 2, and mobile phones). Via a publishing agreement with English company ICE, they developed two adventure games, Alien Virus and Ark of Time but, unhappy with the economic treatment, they decided to switch publisher for Nightlong: Union City Conspiracy, releasing it with Team 17. The adventure was originally designed to be a sequel to Alien Virus, then Trecision modified it with a different cyberpunk theme. This caused a few issues with ICE since, apparently, they worked on the original concept of the game and thought they owned the license to publish it.

In March 2000, Trecision acquired fellow Italian game developer Pixelstorm Games and MotherBrain Entertainment becoming the largest game developer in Italy.

Trecision was working on two games for Cryo Interactive when that company declared bankruptcy in 2002. Consequently Trecision filed for voluntary liquidation in mid-2003. Trecision accredited Cryo's closure with its own bankruptcy.

List of Trecision games

Developed titles

Cancelled titles
 Popeye: Hush Rush for Spinach (PlayStation 2)
 Scooty Racers (PlayStation 2, and Xbox)
 Zidane Football Generation (PlayStation 2)
 Samhain (PC)

References

External links
 Trecision on GameSpot
 Trecision on MobyGames
 Trecision's adventure catalog on Adventure Gamers (5 adventure entries)
 Trecision's adventure catalog on ScummVM (6 adventure entries. Nightlong: UCC was the first supported title on ScummVM.)
 The Big Italian Adventure: The History Of Dynabyte Software on The Genesis Temple (January 20, 2021. Brief mentions of developers from Trecision.)
 The History of Trecision Software on The Genesis Temple (history of the software house in three parts)

Video game companies established in 1991
Video game companies disestablished in 2003
Defunct video game companies of Italy
Video game development companies
Italian companies established in 1991
Italian companies disestablished in 2003